14th Street Bridge may refer to:
Fourteenth Street Bridge (Ohio River) in Louisville, Kentucky
14th Street Bridges over the Potomac River in Washington, D.C.

See also
 14th Street (disambiguation)